Luis Pereyra (born 9 July 1965) is a dancer and choreographer of Tango Argentino and Argentinian folk dances.

Life 
Luis Pereyra was born to a humble working-class family, in the province of Santiago del Estero. At the age of five he danced in folk dancing groups. At the age of eleven he made his first professional appearance as a member of the ballet Argentino directed by Mario Machaco and Norma Ré. He made his first appearance on stage at the legendary Caño 14, where the famous bandoneón player Aníbal Troilo appeared at the same time. Later Luis Pereyra became a member of the Ballett Salta, directed by Marina and Hugo Jiménez.

Luis Pereyra studied choreography under Maestro Alfredo Caruso direction in Teatro Colón, the opera house of Buenos Aires, and at Escuela Nacional de Danzas. He took studies with renowned maestros such as Santiago Ayala "El Chúcaro", Hugo Jiménez, Mario Machaco, Héctor Zaraspe, Irene Acosta, Ana Marini, Vasil Tupin and Mercedes Serrano. His professional education comprises modern dance, classical ballet, jazz dance, folk dances, tap dance and he studied music.

He took part in all of the outstanding tango productions, e.g., Forever Tango, Tango Pasión and – from 1987 to 2000 in the musical Tango Argentino, produced by Claudio Segovia and Héctor Orrezoli. It was here that Luis Pereyra was nominated for the Tony Award He went on tour through the U.S.A., Canada, Great Britain, Germany, Japan, Austria, Switzerland and France. In 2001 he danced the solo part in the opera Orestes – Last Tango, directed by choreographer Oscar Araiz, produced on the occasion of WMTF Festival, the Netherlands. In the course of his career he danced on the important stages e.g., Gershwin Theater on Broadway, Théâtre du Châtelet, Paris, Aldwych Theatre in London´s West End - where in June 91 Lady Diana assited the performance, Cologne Philharmonie, Alte Oper in Frankfurt am Main and Deutsches Theater München (Munic). In 1994 he danced for Paramount Pictures and was presented by Al Pacino. In 1995 he danced in the Castro Theater in San Francisco on stage with Robin Williams and Peter Coyote.

Luis Pereyra was invited to Buckingham Palace to show Lady Diana and King Charles III, then Prince Charles, the Tango Argentino. The journalist Colin Wills then published an article in the Sunday Mirror with a photo collage of both couples.

Luis Pereyra´s choreographic work is influenced mainly by his Argentinian origin. His works are closely related to popular and folk dances and show a pure choice of elements. His oeuvre is based on his principle: "Unity. What belongs together, should not be separated." He regards the culture of Argentine as a unity, and Tango Argentino as an integral part of Argentinian folklore. From his very start he has followed this principle. It is his aim to unite all of Argentine's dances on one stage: Argentine Tango, Chacarera, Milonga, Milonga Sureña ("Souther Milonga"), Zamba, Gato and Malambo, Chamamé just to mention a few of them, being on the same level, in connection with each other and creating a picture of the country Argentine as a whole, as one unity.

Luis Pereyra considers music as genesis of all dance. For this reason he chooses carefully strong and expressive compositions of original Argentinian music and cares about authentic instruments, as Bandoneón, Cajas, Bombo, and others.

Tom Noga wrote on 19 August 2004 in Frankfurter Rundschau, German daily paper: "El Sonido de mi Tierra is a revue of dance and music. A declaration of love to Argentine, her people and landscapes."

In most of his productions Luis Pereyra personally takes part as a dancer and musician. Among his last productions you can find Café de los Angelitos – El Tango as well as all of the productions of his music and dance company El Sonido de mi Tierra (The Sound of my Earth).

Since 2001 Luis Pereyra has been collaborating with his partner under the name of  Nicole Nau & Luis Pereyra. The company he created in 1996 is named El Sonido de mi Tierra - The Great Dance of Argentina. In 2016 he renames his company in El Sonido de mi Tierra - VIDA! Argentino

Appearances as choreographer and dancer: a selection 
1986: A todo Tango, with Mariano Mores - Brazil, Ecuador, Costa Rica, Mexico
1987–2000: Tango Argentino, Musical by Claudio Segovia and Héctor Orezzoli - USA, Canada, Great Britain, Germany, Japan, Switzerland, The Netherlands and France
1988: Tango 88, with Leopoldo Federico - Japan
1990: Forever Tango - USA
1991: Tango with Orquesta Juan d'Arienzo - Japan
1991: Tango 91, with El Sexteto Tango - Japan
1994: Forever Tango - USA
1994: Festival Cosquín 34th edition - Argentina
1995: Tango Pasión, with José Libertella and the Sexteto Mayor - Germany, Spain, The Netherlands, Great Britain
1998: Tango La Danza De Fuego - Argentina
1999–2000: Tango Pasión, with José Libertella and the Sexteto Mayor - Germany, Greece, Great Britain
2001: El Baile, with Peteco Carabajal - Buenos Aires, Argentina
2001–2006: Tango en el Viejo Almacén - traditional tango theater - Buenos Aires, Argentina
2001: Latin Dance Carnival - Japan
2002: Orestes last Tango, tango opera, WMTF World Music Theatre Festival - the Netherlands, Belgium
2003–2005: El Sonido de Mi Tierra – Personalísimo - Europe, Argentina
2006: Bailando en Soledad – Tango! - Europe, Argentina
2007: Secretos de la Danza...Tango! - Europe, Argentina
2007–2010: Café de los Angelitos – El Tango - Buenos Aires, Argentina
2009: Argentinísima - Julio Márbiz - Los 40 años - Buenos Aires, Argentina.
2009: El Color de mi Baile - Europe, Argentina
2010–2011: El Viejo Almacén Artistic Director - Argentina
2011: Tango Puro Argentino tour Europe
2011: Aquí!!! Folklore Teatro Astral, Buenos Aires Argentina. Artistic Director. Artists: Cuti & Roberto Carabajal, El Chaqueño Palavecino, Suna Rocha, Zamba Quipildor, Nicole Nau, Leopoldo Federico, Mario Alvaréz Quiroga, Julia Elena Dávalos. Created by Julio Márbiz
 2011: Misa Criolla at the place of the Monumento a la Bandera, Rosario Argentina. Choreography, Dance and Percussion. Artists: the tenor Zamba Quipildor and Luis Lima.
 2011: Misa Criolla at the Plaza Mayor of Monte Grande Argentina. Choreography, Dance and Percussion. Life transmission on TV by the Argentine channel C5N. Artists: Zamba Quipildor and the Oscar winner Soledad Villamil.
 2011: 7th Festival Internacional de Tango in Justo Daract, San Luis Argentina. Choreography, Dance and Artistic Director for the Viejo Almacén. Live transmission by the Argentine Television Channel 26. Artists: Hugo Marcel and Nelly Vázquez.
2012: Tango Puro Argentino on board of the cruise ship MS Deutschland, Traumschiff. Artists: Carlos Galván
2012: Festival de la Chacarera, Santiago del Estero
2012: Cronica TV - Argentinisima La Peña de Martin Márbiz Artistic Direction of the TV Programm since 18.3.2012
 2012: Carabajalazo in the City Center Rosario
 2012: Tango Puro Argentino y más! artistic director, choreographer and artist. Première at the Centro Cultural Borges, Buenos Aires 17 June 2012. Further Tour through Europe, as Berlin Tipizelt, Theaterhaus Stuttgart, Konzerttheater Coesfeld
 2012: SWR 3 Germany, Menschen der Woche, Frank Elstner
 2012: Performance in Laferrere with Chaqueño Palavecino, live on TV C5N 
 2012: Tango Puro Argentino y más! in Rio Tubio
 2013: Festival Cosquin with Claudio Pereyra Cordoba
 2013: Festival Cosquin Interpretation Vidala para mi Sombra with Oscar El Chaqueño Palavecino Cordoba
 2013: El Sonido de mi Tierra artistic direction, choreography and performance. Debut in the Teatro Sala Siranush, Buenos Aires, 9 February 2013 
 2013: Viejo Almacen in Buenos Aires, special guests in the running show since February 2013
 2013: Viejo Almacén, artistic direction since June 2013
 2013: Das Traumschiff, show on MS Deutschland
 2013: DAS! Abendmagazin, NDR TV Live Show 27.9.2013 
 2013: Tour 2013 El Sonido de mi Tierra - The great dance of Argentina. Premiere 29.9.2013
 2013–2014: El Viejo Almacén Artistic Direction
 2014: Festival Cosquin Edition 54. Presentation with the own company El Sonido de mi Tierra.
 2014: Performance during the presentation of the book of Nicole Nau Tanze Tango mit dem Leben in the German embassy, Buenos Aires Deutschen Botschaft Buenos Aires. The event was organized by ambassador Graf Bernhard von Waldersee and his wife Gräfin Katerina von Waldersee.
 2014–2015: Tour in Europe with the own production VIDA, in more than 70 places as Musical Dome Köln, Colloseum Essen, Philharmonie München, Theaterhaus Stuttgart, World Forum The Hague, Kampnagel Hamburg
 2016: Bayerischen Filmpreis, with actors as Bruno Ganz, Till Schweiger, Uschi Glas
 2017: Tour in Europe with "Vida! Argentino". Derniere at Folies Bergère, Paris.
 2018: Tour in Europe "Vida!", Deutschland, Belgium, Netherland, Austria
 2018: Tour in Europe "Tanze Tango mit dem Leben", Germany, Switzerland
 2019: Tour in Europe "Vida!", Germany, Austria, Switzerland. 25 years Futuro Si at Tonhalle Düsseldorf
 2019: Tour in Europe "Se dice de mi", Germany, TV Programme in Austria and Germany
 2022: VIDA Tour in Argentina, Germany, Suizerland, Austria

Awards 
2000: nomination for the Tony Award as best revival of a musical for Tango - Argentino www.ibdb.com
2012: Tango Puro Argentino y Más has been declared as De Interés Cultural by Secretaría de Cultura de la Presidencia de la Nación, Ref.Expete.S.C.Nro 6020/12
2014: Nicole Nau & Luis Pereyra Company is nominated as Member of the International Dance Council CID
2016: His production Vida! Argentino and company El Sonido de mi Tierra is declared as De Alto Interés Artistico y Cultural, Dirección General del Ministerio de Relaciones Exteriores y Culto el día 31 de mayo 2016, NOTA DICUL 273/2016

DVDs and CDs 
 2004: Curso de Tango & Folklore Argentino. ICARO Producciones.
 2004: El Sonido de mi Tierra. ICARO Producciones.
 2007: Bailando en Soledad Tango. DVD of the presentation on stage.
 2008: Secretos de la Danza, music CD of the show.

References

External links 
 Luis Pereyra at tangofolklore.com
 Luis Pereyra at www.vida.show
 Video Clip Café de los Angelitos - El Tango 2007, 2010 por Guido Gayk y Nicole Nau & Luis Pereyra
 Video Clip El Color de mi Baile, Tango Chacarera y mas, 2009 por Guido Gayk y Nicole Nau & Luis Pereyra
 Cafe de los Angelitos
 Café de los Angelitos
 Tony Award Nomination Tango Argentino Internet Broadway Database
 Café de los Angelitos La Nación, Argentinean daily paper 
 "Tango Opera" La Nación, Argentinean daily paper 

1965 births
Argentine male dancers
Argentine choreographers
Living people
Tango dancers